Sacramento Senators  may refer to:
 Sacramento Senators (baseball)
 Sacramento Senators (soccer)